Carne norte guisado, also known as corned beef guisado, is a Filipino dish made from shredded canned corned beef (carne norte) sautéed with onion rings. It's a very simple dish and is popularly eaten for breakfast with white rice or pandesal. Finely diced potatoes, carrots, scallions, tomatoes, cabbage, bell pepper, and garlic may also be added. A notable variant of the dish is sinabawang corned beef, which just adds beef stock or water to the dish after sautéing, making it soupier.

See also

Tortang carne norte
Poqui poqui

References

External links

Philippine cuisine
Breakfast dishes
Philippine beef dishes